The Surgeon-General of the United Kingdom Armed Forces is the most senior uniformed medical officer in the British Armed Forces.

Army
The post of Surgeon-General dates from 1664; there was also, from 1685, a Physician-General appointed; together, they directed the Army's medical services. These offices lapsed following the establishment of the Army Medical Department in 1810; but in 1874, the title of surgeon-general was reinstated as the highest rank for military medical officers. The rank of deputy surgeon-general was also introduced, although it was redesignated surgeon-colonel from 7 August 1891. In 1918, surgeon-general was redesignated as the standard Army rank of major-general, except for the most senior surgeon-general, who was redesignated a lieutenant-general.

Defence Medical Services
Latterly, the role was described as "professional head of Defence Medical Services and the Defence Authority for end to end Defence healthcare and medical operational capability". It had always been held by a three-star military medical officer, with the title of Surgeon-General; but in July 2019 a civilian was appointed to the role for the first time, Peter Homa, whose job title is Director General of the Defence Medical Services (DGDMS). The last person to have been appointed Surgeon-General as both professional head of the Defence Medical Services and head of the Joint Medical Group was Lieutenant-General Martin Bricknell, although Air Vice-Marshal Alastair Reid was Acting Surgeon-General of the Defence Medical Services from 2018 to 2019. On the appointment of Peter Homa as Director General of the Defence Medical Services, Reid was confirmed as Defence Medical Director, with responsibility for medical operational capability, medical policy and research and development. In future, the role of Director-General will continue to be open to both serving and civilian candidates.

List of Surgeons-General since 1990

References

External links
Defence Medical Services – HQ Surgeon General/ Director General Defence Medical Services

British military appointments
Military medicine in the United Kingdom